Rory Wilbur White (born August 16, 1959) is an American former professional basketball player. A 6'8" (2.03 m) and 210 lb (95 kg) power forward, he played collegiately at the University of South Alabama, and was the Sun Belt Conference Player of the Year in 1979. He was selected with the 17th pick of the fourth round of the 1982 NBA draft by the Phoenix Suns. He averaged 11.7 points and 0.99 steals per game with the Los Angeles Clippers in 1985–86, arguably his best season.

After his NBA career ended in 1987, White played in the CBA (with Santa Barbara, Rapid City, Oklahoma City and Fargo-Moorhead) and overseas (Argentina, Belgium, Israel, Italy and Spain).

Career statistics

NBA

Regular season

|-
| align="left" | 1982–83
| align="left" | Phoenix
| 65 || 0 || 9.6 || .543 || .000 || .642 || 1.6 || 0.5 || 0.2 || 0.0 || 5.0
|-
| align="left" | 1983–84
| align="left" | Phoenix
| 22 || 2 || 14.0 || .479 || .000 || .571 || 2.8 || 0.6 || 0.6 || 0.1 || 7.4
|-
| align="left" | 1983–84
| align="left" | Milwaukee
| 8 || 0 || 5.6 || .412 || .000 || .400 || 1.0 || 0.1 || 0.3 || 0.1 || 2.0
|-
| align="left" | 1983–84
| align="left" | San Diego
| 6 || 0 || 3.2 || .444 || .000 || .000 || 0.7 || 0.0 || 0.0 || 0.0 || 1.3
|-
| align="left" | 1984–85
| align="left" | Los Angeles
| 80 || 14 || 13.8 || .516 || .000 || .692 || 2.4 || 0.4 || 0.4 || 0.3 || 4.7
|-
| align="left" | 1985–86
| align="left" | Los Angeles
| 75 || 30 || 23.5 || .519 || .111 || .739 || 2.4 || 1.0 || 1.0 || 0.1 || 11.7
|-
| align="left" | 1986–87
| align="left" | Los Angeles
| 68 || 35 || 22.7 || .480 || .000 || .653 || 2.9 || 1.2 || 0.7 || 0.3 || 9.2
|- class="sortbottom"
| style="text-align:center;" colspan="2"| Career
| 324 || 81 || 16.7 || .506 || .077 || .681 || 2.3 || 0.7 || 0.6 || 0.2 || 7.4
|}

Playoffs

|-
| align="left" | 1982–83
| align="left" | Phoenix
| 3 || - || 13.3 || .500 || .000 || .500 || 3.3 || 0.0 || 0.0 || 0.0 || 5.3
|- class="sortbottom"
| style="text-align:center;" colspan="2"| Career
| 3 || - || 13.3 || .500 || .000 || .500 || 3.3 || 0.0 || 0.0 || 0.0 || 5.3
|}

College

|-
| align="left" | 1977–78
| align="left" | South Alabama
| 28 || - || 19.2 || .539 || - || .635 || 4.4 || 0.3 || - || 0.5 || 8.1
|-
| align="left" | 1978–79
| align="left" | South Alabama
| 27 || - || 31.7 || .553 || - || .670 || 8.4 || - || - || - || 19.0
|-
| align="left" | 1979–80
| align="left" | South Alabama
| 2 || - || 5.0 || .750 || - || .000 || 0.5 || - || - || - || 3.0
|-
| align="left" | 1980–81
| align="left" | South Alabama
| 31 || - || 33.3 || .589 || - || .721 || 6.6 || 0.5 || - || - || 16.4
|-
| align="left" | 1981–82
| align="left" | South Alabama
| 28 || 24 || 33.5 || .562 || - || .703 || 6.5 || 1.0 || 0.8 || 0.4 || 16.9
|- class="sortbottom"
| style="text-align:center;" colspan="2"| Career
| 116 || 24 || 29.1 || .564 || - || .686 || 6.4 || 0.4 || 0.2 || 0.2 || 14.9
|}

References

External links
Rory White NBA coach file, nba.com
Rory White NBA stats, basketballreference.com
College Stats

1959 births
Living people
21st-century African-American people
African-American basketball coaches
African-American basketball players
Albuquerque Silvers players
American expatriate basketball people in Argentina
American expatriate basketball people in Belgium
American expatriate basketball people in Israel
American expatriate basketball people in Italy
American expatriate basketball people in Spain
American expatriate basketball people in Venezuela
American men's basketball players
Basketball coaches from Alabama
Basketball players from Alabama
BC Oostende players
Dakota Wizards coaches
Fargo-Moorhead Fever players
Ferro Carril Oeste basketball players
Idaho Stampede (CBA) coaches
Liga ACB players
Los Angeles Clippers players
Milwaukee Bucks players
Oklahoma City Cavalry players
Phoenix Suns draft picks
Phoenix Suns players
Rapid City Thrillers players
San Diego Clippers players
Santa Barbara Islanders players
Small forwards
South Alabama Jaguars men's basketball players
Sportspeople from Tuskegee, Alabama
Wyoming Wildcatters players
20th-century African-American sportspeople